Alcidodes texatus, is a species of weevil found in Sri Lanka.

Description
This small, slender species has a body length is about 6.5 to 8 mm. Body black, where the antennae and legs are black or reddish brown. Body covered with whitish-yellow scales. Pronotum with 3 longitudinal stripes dorsally. Elytra with a straight longitudinal stripe. Proboscis narrow and cylindrical, and widened at the root and tip which slightly downwards bent over. Pronotal puncturation fine and moderately dense. Forehead and trunk slightly convex. Pronotum transverse, and shiny granules. Eye lobes slightly developed. Elytra wider than the pronotum.

References 

Curculionidae
Insects of Sri Lanka
Beetles described in 1960